Monrovia is a town in Monroe Township, Morgan County, in the U.S. state of Indiana. The population was 1,063 at the 2010 census.

History
Monrovia was laid out in 1834, Laid after Liberia's Capital Name. The town's name is derived from Monroe Township. A post office has been in operation at Monrovia since 1834.

The Lake Ditch Bridge was listed on the National Register of Historic Places in 2001.

The town is the subject of the well-regarded Frederick Wiseman documentary, Monrovia, Indiana, released in October 2018.

Geography
Monrovia is located at  (39.579389, -86.480402).

Demographics

2010 census
As of the census of 2010, there were 1,063 people, 365 households, and 288 families living in the town. The racial makeup of the town was 97.3% White, 1.4% African American, 0.1% Native American, 0.6% Asian, 0.2% from other races, and 0.5% from two or more races. Hispanic or Latino of any race were 1.2% of the population.

There were 365 households, of which 47.1% had children under the age of 18 living with them, 60.5% were married couples living together, 13.4% had a female householder with no husband present, 4.9% had a male householder with no wife present, and 21.1% were non-families. 16.4% of all households were made up of individuals, and 4.6% had someone living alone who was 65 years of age or older. The average household size was 2.91 and the average family size was 3.27.

The median age in the town was 31.2 years. 31.1% of residents were under the age of 18; 8.7% were between the ages of 18 and 24; 32.3% were from 25 to 44; 21% were from 45 to 64; and 6.9% were 65 years of age or older. The gender makeup of the town was 49.3% male and 50.7% female.

2000 census
As of the census of 2000, there were 628 people, 234 households, and 187 families living in the town. The racial makeup of the town was 99.20% White, 0.16% from other races, and 0.64% from two or more races. Hispanic or Latino of any race were 0.96% of the population.

There were 234 households, out of which 36.8% had children under the age of 18 living with them, 64.1% were married couples living together, 13.2% had a female householder with no husband present, and 19.7% were non-families. 16.7% of all households were made up of individuals, and 5.6% had someone living alone who was 65 years of age or older. The average household size was 2.68 and the average family size was 2.97.

In the town, the population was spread out, with 25.3% under the age of 18, 10.0% from 18 to 24, 27.7% from 25 to 44, 26.3% from 45 to 64, and 10.7% who were 65 years of age or older. The median age was 38 years. For every 100 females, there were 86.4 males. For every 100 females age 18 and over, there were 81.8 males.

The median income for a household in the town was $49,583, and the median income for a family was $53,571. Males had a median income of $32,917 versus $21,111 for females. The per capita income for the town was $20,366. About 6.8% of families and 8.6% of the population were below the poverty line, including 14.4% of those under age 18 and 2.9% of those age 65 or over.

Education

The Monroe-Gregg School District which serves students in Monroe and Gregg townships in Morgan County operates three schools:

 Monrovia Elementary School, recently constructed, houses grades K-5.  It replaced Hall Elementary School.
 Monrovia Middle School, houses grades 6–8.
 Monrovia Junior-Senior High School houses grades 9-12.

Hall Elementary School, which had previously housed grades 4-6 (with Monrovia Elementary School housing K-3 and Monrovia Junior-Senior High School housing 7-12), has recently closed.

Monrovia has a public library, a branch of the Morgan County Public Library.

Notable people
 Gary Bettenhausen - IndyCar driver
 John Van Lindley - pomologist and early nurseryman
 Branch McCracken - NCAA championship basketball coach
 John Standeford - NFL wide receiver

References

Towns in Morgan County, Indiana
Towns in Indiana
Indianapolis metropolitan area